David Bailey is a New Zealand former professional rugby league footballer who played in the 1990s and 2000s, as a , and also as a . He is the son of New Zealand international rugby league footballer; Roger Bailey.

Early years
Bailey was a Te Atatu Roosters junior and played for them in the Auckland competition. Bailey also represented Ponsonby. He made his début for Auckland in 1991 and represented the New Zealand Māori side at the 1992 Pacific Cup.

In the early-nineties he traveled to England and played for the Rochdale Hornets, before returning to New Zealand for the 1994 Lion Red Cup. He played in 17 matches for the Waitakere City Raiders that year, scoring 84 points. At the end of the season he was signed by the Wakefield Trinity (Heritage No. 1065).

In 1996 he returned to New Zealand, playing again for the Waitakere City Raiders in the Lion Red Cup. He was part of the side that lost the 1996 Grand Final, although he did score a try in that match.

He was an Auckland representative between 1992 and 1996.

Warrior
Bailey joined the Auckland Warriors in 1997 and was expected to push hard for a first grade centre berth. Despite this he only played three games in the Super League that year, starting one at centre.

Later years
In 2001 Bailey played for the Glenora Bears in the Bartercard Cup.

Bailey was then involved with the Ponsonby Ponies of the Auckland Rugby League.

References

1969 births
Living people
Auckland rugby league team players
Glenora Bears players
Junior Kiwis players
New Zealand Māori rugby league players
New Zealand Māori rugby league team players
New Zealand rugby league players
New Zealand Warriors players
Ponsonby Ponies players
Rochdale Hornets players
Rugby league centres
Rugby league five-eighths
Rugby league players from Auckland
Te Atatu Roosters players
Waitakere rugby league team players
Wakefield Trinity players